Dangerous Touch is a 1994 American erotic thriller film directed by Lou Diamond Phillips (in his directorial debut) and written by Kurt Voss and Phillips. It stars Phillips and Kate Vernon. It was released direct-to-video on October 12, 1994.

The main themes of the film are blackmail and amateur pornography. A female radio host has an ill-advised sexual relationship with a hustler. He has videotaped their sexual encounters, and threatens to publicize them.

Plot

Radiotherapist Amanda Grace's life turns hellish after she becomes involved with young hustler Mick Burroughs. Mick seduces the radio host to get hold of a file she has on a criminal who also happens to be one of her patients. Soon, the two are having steamy, erotic encounters that include kinky sex. But she gets so caught up in their relationship that she leaves herself wide open to Mick's treachery. Amanda finds her entire career in jeopardy when Mick blackmails her and threatens to show everyone an incriminating videotape of them having sex, which also involved a female prostitute if she doesn't do whatever he says.

Cast
Kate Vernon as Amanda Grace 
Lou Diamond Phillips as Mick Burroughs
Andrew Divoff as Johnnie 
Tom Dugan as Freddie 
Max Gail as Jasper Stone 
Ira Heiden as Benny 
Karla Montana as Maria 
Monique Parent as Nicole 
Mitch Pileggi as Vince 
Adam Roarke as Robert Turner 
Berlinda Tolbert as Sasha T

Production
Kate Vernon admits she passed on the project "the first time I saw the script because the material was so erotic and strong it frightened me. I hadn't done any major sex scenes before, and I just said no." Later she said yes - after being assured by Lou Diamond Phillips that the sexual content and the nudity would be handled artistically."

References

External links

1994 films
1990s erotic thriller films
1994 directorial debut films
1994 direct-to-video films
American erotic thriller films
Trimark Pictures films
Films scored by Terry Plumeri
Films about radio people
Films about pornography
1990s English-language films
1990s American films